"On the Verge" is a song written by Hugh Prestwood, and recorded by American country music artist Collin Raye.  It was released in February 1997 as the sixth and final single from Raye's album I Think About You.  The song reached #2 on the Billboard Hot Country Singles & Tracks chart in May 1997.

Chart performance 
"On the Verge" debuted at number 44 on the U.S. Billboard Hot Country Singles & Tracks for the week of February 22, 1997.

Year-end charts

References

1997 singles
1995 songs
Collin Raye songs
Songs written by Hugh Prestwood
Song recordings produced by Paul Worley
Epic Records singles